Thamnosara sublitella is a moth of the family Oecophoridae first described by Francis Walker in 1864. It is endemic to New Zealand.

References

Moths described in 1864
Oecophoridae
Taxa named by Francis Walker (entomologist)
Moths of New Zealand
Endemic fauna of New Zealand
Endemic moths of New Zealand